Chlorida cincta is a species of beetle in the family Cerambycidae. It was described by Félix Édouard Guérin-Méneville in 1844. It is known from Mexico, Colombia, and Ecuador.

References

Bothriospilini
Beetles described in 1844
Taxa named by Félix Édouard Guérin-Méneville
Beetles of South America
Beetles of North America